Cupid Media, owned by Dating Group, is an online dating company that operates 33 active niche dating websites based on religion, ethnicity, lifestyle and special interests. The network of sites are available in multiple languages and since its founding in 2000, over 60 million singles have registered across the company's sites. Cupid Media is based on the Gold Coast in Queensland, Australia.

History

Originally starting with one dating site, AsianEuro.com, now AsianDating.com the company has now grown to 33 active dating sites targeting multiple countries, languages and ethnicities around the world. Popular Cupid Media brands include Muslima.com, ThaiCupid  and FilipinoCupid.

The websites are built on Adobe ColdFusion and are available on iOS and Android devices via native HTML5 mobile sites.

On 13 January 2013, Cupid Media confirmed that its password database had been breached and a section of its user base had been affected. Affected members were contacted by the company requesting them to change their password as well as additional security measures being put in place.

On 28 July 2021, Dating Group announced its acquisition of Cupid Media.

Business and products
Cupid Media operates a network of 33 dating sites that target lifestyles, ethnicities, countries and special interests including:

 AfroIntroductions
 AsianDating
 AussieCupid – no longer active
 BBWCupid
 BlackCupid
 BrazilCupid
 CambodianCupid – launched November 2020
 CaribbeanCupid
 ChinaLoveCupid
 ChristianCupid
 ColombianCupid
 DominicanCupid
 FilipinoCupid – an international dating site aimed at bringing singles from the Philippines together with singles from around the world. Ranked 1,734 most popular site in the Philippines with 5.5 million members.
 GayCupid
 HongKongCupid
 IndianCupid
 IndonesianCupid
 InternationalCupid
 InterracialCupid
 IranianSinglesConnection – no longer active
 JapanCupid
 KenyanCupid
 KoreanCupid
 LatinAmericanCupid – bringing together Latin Singles from Central and South America.
 MalaysianCupid
 MexicanCupid
 MilitaryCupid – a special interests dating site that brings together Military singles with local singles.
 Muslima
 PinkCupid
 RussianCupid
 SingaporeLoveLinks
 SingleParentLove – no longer active
 SouthAfricanCupid
 ThaiCupid.com – a Thai online dating site that serves both the domestic Thai market and the international market. Ranked 206th most popular site in Thailand according to Alexa.com. 
 UkraineDate
 VietnamCupid

See also

 Match.com
 eHarmony
 AnastasiaDate

References

External links

Companies based on the Gold Coast, Queensland
Online dating services of Australia
Software companies established in 2000